The Castle of the Masovian Dukes is a Gothic castle located in Czersk (36 km south of Warsaw), Masovian Voivodeship in Poland.

History
The Czersk Castle was built at the turning point of the fourteenth and fifteenth century by Duke Janusz I, after the Masovian land became part of the Kingdom of Poland under the rule of Queen Bona Sforza. The castle had three towers, with one of them—being four-sided—used as the main gate house.

In 1656, during the war with the Swedes, the castle was partially ruined, when the retreating land army under Stefan Czarniecki's command had captured and demolished the stronghold. The castle was rebuilt between 1762–1766 under the command of Marszałek Franciszek Bieliński. Later, during the Prussian Partition, a Prussian leader had ordered for demolition of the castle's defense walls, reducing its military importance as a stronghold. In the years to follow, no more reconstruction work on the castle had ever been attempted. Today, only the towers, a brick bridge from the eighteenth century, and the north and east wing of the castle remain of the overall stronghold.

See also
 List of castles in Poland

References

Buildings and structures completed in 1410
15th-century fortifications
Castles in Masovian Voivodeship
Chojnice County
1410 establishments in Europe